The Sydney JetCats were a class of catamarans operated by the State Transit Authority and Sydney Ferries Corporation on the Manly service.

History
Three JetCats were delivered in 1990/91 to replace the remaining four Sydney hydrofoils on the Manly service. The 268-seat vessels were built by NQEA, Cairns to an Incat Crowther design.

In December 2008, the State Government announced the JetCat service would cease and called for tenders to operate the service on a commercial basis. The last JetCat service operated on 31 December 2008. JetCat patronage had dropped from 1,453,000 passengers per annum in 1995/96 to 393,506 between July and December 2008, while ferry patronage on the route rose from 3.7 million to 6.0 million (full 08/09 year) in the same period. However this referenced source clearly reveals the change in Jetcat patronage can be explained by the reduction in the number of timetabled Jetcat services being operated from typically 256 return trips per week in 1995/96, down to 116 per week in 2008 (both including ferry replacement trips). The JetCats were sold to a broker, who resold them for three times the price.

Bass & Flinders Cruises trading as Manly Fast Ferries commenced operating the service on 10 February 2009.

Vessels 
 Ex-Manly JetCat "Sea Eagle" was destroyed by fire in 2019 at her berth, along with another vessel "Forward" - both vessels were "utility boats" serving offshore platforms. Arson is suspected.

See also
 List of Sydney Harbour ferries
 Timeline of Sydney Harbour ferries

References

Catamarans
Ferry transport in Sydney
Ships built in Queensland
Ferry classes